Mayaguana Airport  is an airport in Mayaguana in the Bahamas.

Airlines and destinations

References

Airports in the Bahamas